Mykola Mozghovyi (September 1, 1947 – July 30, 2010) was a Ukrainian and Soviet composer, producer, and songwriter.

He was born in Sarniv, Volochysk Raion, Khmelnytskyi Oblast, Ukraine.

Mozhovyy's major success was the song "Kray, miy ridniy kray", written for Sofia Rotaru and produced by Melodiya.

He was a manager of Palace "Ukraine" in 2000s.

References

Sources 
 

1947 births
2010 deaths
People from Khmelnytskyi Oblast
Soviet male composers
Ukrainian record producers
Ukrainian songwriters
20th-century male musicians
Ukrainian-language singers